This is a list of the National Register of Historic Places listings in San Juan County, New Mexico.

This is intended to be a complete list of the properties and districts on the National Register of Historic Places in San Juan County, New Mexico, United States.  Latitude and longitude coordinates are provided for many National Register properties and districts; these locations may be seen together in a map.

There are 38 properties and districts listed on the National Register in the county. All of the listings within the county with the single exception of the Aztec Ruins Administration Building-Museum are also recorded on the State Register of Cultural Properties.

Current listings

|}

See also

 List of National Historic Landmarks in New Mexico
 National Register of Historic Places listings in New Mexico

References

San Juan